Pterocerina angulata is a species of ulidiid or picture-winged fly in the genus Pterocerina of the family Ulidiidae.

References

angulata
Insects described in 1909